George W. Cave is a CIA operations officer and authority on Iran who took part in the Iran-Contra arms sale.

George Cave majored in Middle Eastern studies at Princeton University, where he studied from 1952 to 1956, and joined CIA after graduation. One account claims Cave served for the CIA in Teheran during the 1953 Iranian coup d'état that restored the Shah of Iran to power. In the mid 1970s he served in Tehran as deputy CIA station chief, with personal ties to the Shah. His "pseudo name" was "Adlesick". In the series "Documents from the U.S. Espionage Den" he is referred to in volumes 10, 17, 38, 55 and 56. In October 1979, he gave a briefing to Abbas Amir-Entezam and Ebrahim Yazdi, based on intelligence from the IBEX system, that Iraq was preparing to invade.

By 1977, when he was working in Jeddah, he had six children, three of whom were in college.

He testified against Clair George about the CIA's involvement in Iran-Contra.

He published his first novel, October 1980 in December 2013. In his final interview Duane Clarridge, former CIA operations officer and Iran-Contra figure, hinted that this novel was a largely accurate depiction of how Reagan's October Surprise transpired.

The International Spy Museum interviewed him about his career in June 2012.

He attended Milton Hershey School where he graduated in 1947 and was named Alumnus of the Year in 2001.

Selected works

References 

People of the Central Intelligence Agency
Recipients of the Intelligence Medal of Merit
1929 births
Living people